P.S. Jerusalem is a 2015 documentary film directed by Israeli filmmaker and cinematographer, Danae Elon. The film is a first person documentary journey about the director's return to Jerusalem, the city of her youth.

Festivals and awards

References

External links 
 Official Website
 P.S. Jerusalem at the Internet Movie Database
 P.S. Jerusalem at Rotten Tomatoes
 P.S. Jerusalem at AllMovie

Films about Jews and Judaism
Israeli documentary films
Canadian documentary films
2015 documentary films
2010s Canadian films